Ernest Frederick III Karl, Duke of Saxe-Hildburghausen (10 June 1727 in Königsberg in Bayern – 23 September 1780 in Seidingstadt), was a duke of Saxe-Hildburghausen.

Biography
Ernest Frederick was born on 10 June 1727. He was the eldest son of Ernst Frederick II, Duke of Saxe-Hildburghausen and Caroline of Erbach-Fürstenau.

Ernest Frederick succeeded his father as Duke of Saxe-Hildburghausen when he was only eighteen years old in 1745; as a result his mother, the Dowager Duchess Caroline, acted as a regent on his behalf until he reached adulthood, in 1748.

Ernst Frederick was considered to be intelligent, talented, and one of the most handsome princes of his time. He donated a library to the city, but finally his excessive prodigality in exaggerated court pomp and military splendor drew the attention of the highest places to the financial situation of his country.

The Emperor Joseph II created a debit commission under management of the Duchess Charlotte Amalie of Saxe-Meiningen and prince Joseph of Saxe-Hildburghausen, the granduncle of the duke, to investigate the demands of the creditors and adjust the incomes and expenditures to 1769. The financial situation of the country was so disastrous that 35 years duration of this commission could not repair conditions completely.

After Ernest Frederick made use in 1757 of the Münzregal (Imperial coinage regale), he was entangled in a complaint of the realm treasury. Finally, the huge fire of the city of Hildburghausen in 1779, forced Ernst Fredercik to move to his hunting residence in Seidingstadt, where he died a year later.

Family
In the Hirschholm Palace, north of Copenhagen on 1 October 1749, Ernst Frederick was first married to Princess Louise of Denmark, daughter of the King Christian VI. They had one daughter:
 Princess Friederike Sophie Juliane Karoline of Saxe-Hildburghausen (b. Hildburghausen, 5 December 1755 – d. Hildburghausen, 10 January 1756).

In the Christiansborg Palace, Copenhagen on 20 January 1757, five months after the death of his first wife, Ernst Frederick was married for the second time to Christiane Sophie Charlotte of Brandenburg-Bayreuth. They had one daughter:
 Princess Friederike Sophie Marie Karoline of Saxe-Hildburghausen (b. Seidingstadt, 4 October 1757 – d. Seidingstadt, 17 October 1757).

In Bayreuth on 1 July 1758, nine months after the death of his second wife, Ernst Frederick was married for the third time to Ernestine, a daughter of Duke Ernst August I of Saxe-Weimar. They had three children:
 Princess Ernestine Frederike Sophie of Saxe-Hildburghausen (b. Hildburghausen, 22 February 1760 – d. Coburg, 28 October 1776), married on 6 March 1776 to Franz Frederick Anton, Duke of Saxe-Coburg-Saalfeld. She died childless only six months after her wedding.
 Princess Christiane Sophie Caroline of Saxe-Hildburghausen (b. Hildburghausen, 4 December 1761 – d. Öhringen, 10 January 1790), married on 13 March 1778 to her uncle Eugen of Saxe-Hildeburghausen, who was her father's own brother. They had no children.
 Frederick, Duke of Saxe-Hildburghausen (b. Hildburghausen, 29 April 1763 – d. Jagdhaus Hummelshain, Altenburg, 29 September 1834). He married Charlotte Georgine of Mecklenburg-Strelitz, sister of the queens of Prussia and Hanover; they became the parents of 12 children

Ancestry

References 

1727 births
1780 deaths
Dukes of Saxe-Hildburghausen
Nobility from Königsberg
Recipients of the Order of the White Eagle (Poland)